Kontinuum is the thirty-sixth album by Klaus Schulze. It was originally released in 2007, and, taking in consideration the previously released multi-disc box sets (Silver Edition, Historic Edition, Jubilee Edition, Contemporary Works I, and Contemporary Works II), it could be viewed as Schulze's ninety-seventh album.

Track listing
All tracks composed by Klaus Schulze.

External links
 Kontinuum at the official site of Klaus Schulze
 
 AllMusic

References

Klaus Schulze albums
Ambient albums
Trance albums
2007 albums